Stears is a surname. Notable people with the surname include:

Anne Stears, South African cricketer
John Stears (1934–1999), English special effects expert
Marc Stears (born 1971), English political scientist

See also
Stear